John Morgan Roderick (born September 13, 1968) is an American musician, singer, songwriter, podcaster, and politician. He is the lead singer and guitarist of the rock band The Long Winters, was a touring member of the rock band Harvey Danger, and co-hosts the podcasts Roderick On The Line, Road Work, and Omnibus.

Early life 
Roderick was born in Seattle on September 13, 1968, the son of Marcia and David Roderick. His father was a Washington State legislator and World War II veteran. His mother was a computer programmer who eventually rose to an executive position working for the Trans-Alaska Pipeline System. Roderick has three older half-siblings from his father, and a sister, Susan.

In 1971, the family moved to Anchorage, Alaska. In 1973, Roderick's parents divorced and his mother took John and Susan back to Washington state, but returned to Anchorage shortly after. He graduated from East Anchorage High and moved back to Seattle. Roderick enrolled at Gonzaga University in 1987, but left after two years. In 2019, Roderick graduated with a BA from the University of Washington after three decades of undergraduate study.

Career

Western State Hurricanes (1997–1999) 

Roderick's first major band was The Western State Hurricanes, which he started while attending the University of Washington. The band enjoyed quick success, playing their first show at Seattle venue "The Breakroom" in May 1998. The band split after failing to sign a deal with Sub Pop Records. Having recorded an unreleased album in the late 1990s, Roderick was prompted by Pete Greenberg to remaster their debut album, Through With Love, which was announced in late 2019 by Latent Print Records. In February 2020, the band regrouped to perform shows, including a recorded performance on KEXP.

Harvey Danger (1999–2001) 

After the disbanding of The Western State Hurricanes, Roderick was offered a spot to play keyboard in popular Seattle band Harvey Danger. Roderick played with the band until they went on hiatus in April 2001.

The Long Winters (2001–present) 

Along with former Harvey Danger singer/songwriter Sean Nelson, Roderick founded the indie rock band The Long Winters in the wake of Harvey Danger's breakup. Roderick penned the band's first album, The Worst You Can Do Is Harm, in 2001 and released the album on Barsuk Records. The band since released two more albums, When I Pretend to Fall (2003) and Putting the Days to Bed (2006), and one EP titled Ultimatum (2005). The band still plays shows, playing at the inaugural Upstream Festival in 2017.

Podcasts 

In September 2011, Roderick began co-hosting the Roderick on the Line podcast with Merlin Mann. On August 13, 2015, he released the first episode of his second podcast, called Road Work, with co-host Dan Benjamin. Both podcasts are loose-form and conversation based, with new episodes released at irregular intervals.

On September 7, 2017, HowStuffWorks announced a new show entitled Omnibus, co-hosted by Roderick and former Jeopardy! champion Ken Jennings. Alternating as host each episode, they discuss topics they "fear might be lost to history", typically niche cultural trends and historical events. The first episode was posted on December 7, 2017. On August 9, 2019, they announced their separation from iHeartRadio, and shifted to a Patreon-funded model. On January 1, 2023, the podcast decreased from twice weekly to once a week, citing the time required for Jennings' work as Jeopardy! host.

Roderick, along with Adam Pranica and Benjamin Ahr Harrison, presented Friendly Fire, a weekly podcast about war films that ran from January 12, 2018 to January 22, 2021.

Musical collaborations 
Roderick frequently collaborates with other musicians. Along with collaborator Sean Nelson, he provided vocals on Death Cab for Cutie's album Transatlanticism. He also collaborated with Jonathan Coulton for Coulton's album Artificial Heart, released in September 2011, as well as the duo's Christmas album One Christmas at a Time. Roderick co-wrote the song "Poor Judge" on Aimee Mann's 2017 album Mental Illness. Roderick co-wrote "Soft Place to Land" for Kathleen Edwards's Voyageur album; the song won the 2012 SOCAN Echo Songwriting Prize.

Political career 

Roderick became a founding member of the Seattle Music Commission in 2010, appointed to the position by former Seattle Mayor Mike McGinn.

In 2015, encouraged by McGinn, Roderick announced his candidacy for Seattle City Council Position 8, one of two city council positions that represent the entire city. He came in third place in the citywide primary, winning 15.90% of the vote.

Personal life 
Roderick currently lives in Seattle with his daughter. In 2017, he was honored with the position of King Neptune for the 2017 Seattle Seafair.

In January 2021, Roderick posted a Twitter thread in which he discussed preventing his nine-year-old daughter from eating a can of baked beans until she could open it using a manual can opener by herself, which he estimated took six hours. His comments were met with a large outcry on Twitter, and some users began derisively referring to Roderick as "Bean Dad".

Following the controversy, the podcast My Brother, My Brother and Me, which had previously used The Long Winters' song "It's a Departure" from the album Putting the Days to Bed as a theme, announced that they would be removing the music from the show. Friendly Fire, which was co-hosted by Roderick, went on a brief hiatus before announcing on January 22 that it would not be returning.

Roderick posted an extensive apology to his website addressing the controversy. Roderick stated the story was "poorly told", and not properly contextualized. He added that they had eaten a large breakfast, that they were smiling and laughing throughout the ordeal, and that she had had access to other snacks. He also apologized for the language of his story, claiming he was not aware how it affected abuse survivors. Roderick additionally addressed his self-described "racist, anti-Semitic, hurtful and slur-filled tweets" from 2011 that had resurfaced at the same time.

Roderick later stated he received a visit from Child Protective Services to verify the welfare of his daughter because of the controversy, and that they had found nothing of concern.

References

External links

 Interview with John on Mammothpress.com
 4-part Interview on The Merlin Show by Merlin Mann
 Feature in The Stranger by Jeff Deroche
 Interview in The Believer by Litsa Dremousis, June/July 2005
 Interview in playinginfog by Kate Izquierdo, October 2005
 Podcast with Merlin Mann: Roderick on the Line

1968 births
20th-century American guitarists
20th-century American male musicians
20th-century American male writers
21st-century American guitarists
21st-century American male musicians
21st-century American male writers
American male guitarists
American podcasters
American rock guitarists
American male singer-songwriters
Candidates in the 2015 United States elections
Guitarists from Washington (state)
Harvey Danger members
Living people
Musicians from Anchorage, Alaska
Politicians from Seattle
The Long Winters members
The Minus 5 members
Writers from Anchorage, Alaska
Writers from Seattle
Singer-songwriters from Washington (state)